Ibričevina is a suburb of Podgorica, Montenegro.

References

Suburbs of Podgorica